Termal is a town and district of Yalova Province in the Marmara region of Turkey. It is renowned for its hot springs.  Yalova Thermal Baths are located in Yalova, about 80 km away from Istanbul. The huge complex, lying on a land of about 1,6M square metres, is located 12 km away from Yalova. There are four hotels in the complex, one of which is an apart. There are also five baths which possess historical value. The mayor is Hüseyin Acar (AK Party).

Festivals
A periodic Sufi festival is held at the Rasim Mutlu Kültür Merkezi, founded by Rahmi Oruç Güvenç (aka Oruch Baba), which attracts visitors from all over the world. Participants perform the sema continuously for days in a row.

Gallery

References

 
Populated places in Yalova Province
Yalova
Yalova Province